Jerzy Pniewski (June 1, 1913 – June 16, 1989) was a Polish physicist.

Pniewski was born in Płock. He studied mathematics and physics at the University of Warsaw.

In 1952, he co-discovered the hypernucleus with Marian Danysz. In 1962, he discovered hypernuclear isomery.

References 

1913 births
1989 deaths
20th-century Polish physicists